Imogen Jennifer Heap (born 9 December 1977) is a British musician, singer, songwriter and record producer. Her work has been considered pioneering in pop and electropop music.

Heap classically trained in piano, cello and clarinet starting at a young age. She began writing songs at the age of 13 and, while attending boarding school, taught herself music production. After being discovered by manager Mickey Modern while attending the BRIT School, Heap signed to independent record label Almo Sounds at the age of 18 and later began working with experimental pop band Acacia. She released her debut album, an alternative rock record, I Megaphone, in 1998. In early 2002, Heap and English record producer Guy Sigsworth formed the electronic duo Frou Frou and released their only album to date, Details (2002).

Her second studio album, Speak for Yourself, was released in 2005 on her own label, Megaphonic Records, and was certified gold in the United States and Canada. The album spawned three singles: "Headlock", "Goodnight and Go", which became her highest-charting single as a lead artist on the UK Singles Chart, and "Hide and Seek", which was certified gold in the United States and gained popularity after being used in the Fox teen drama television series The O.C.. Heap's third studio album, Ellipse (2009), peaked in the top five of the Billboard 200 chart and received mostly positive reviews. This was followed by her fourth studio album, Sparks (2014). In 2017, she reunited with Sigsworth as part of Frou Frou.

Heap developed the Mi.Mu Gloves, a line of musical gloves, as well as a blockchain-based music-sharing program, Mycelia. She also composed the music for the West End/Broadway play Harry Potter and the Cursed Child. Over the course of her career, she has received two Grammy Awards, one Ivor Novello Award, and one Drama Desk Award. In July 2019, Heap was awarded an honorary doctorate from Berklee College of Music.

Early life
Imogen Jennifer Heap was born on 9 December 1977 in Havering, Greater London. Her name was inspired by that of British composer Imogen Holst, as her mother wanted Heap to become a cellist like Holst. She played music from an early age, first learning the piano due to "wanting attention" as a middle child and realizing, according to her, that "it was something [she] could make a lot of noise with". She did not enjoy playing the music of classical composers such as Bach and Beethoven, and would instead attempt to play in their style to convince her parents she was practicing their music. As a child, she began recording music by recording herself playing piano on cassette, then recording herself again singing over it. She soon began taking lessons and became classically trained in several instruments including piano, cello and clarinet while attending Friends School, a private, Quaker-run boarding school in Saffron Walden. At around age 10, she began composing Christmas carols for her school's choir.

Due to being placed a year above children her age, Heap claims she did not get along with many people from the school and spent most of her time in the music room practising piano. She stated, "In boarding school...I was mocked about the clothes I wore, the way I looked, whatever. People there really did regard me as some kind of freak from the middle of nowhere. And these things do matter a lot when you are sixteen, seventeen." Heap's mother, an art therapist, and father, a construction rock retailer, separated when she was twelve years old. Also at age twelve, she taught herself how to use Cubase on an Atari computer at Friends School. By the age of thirteen, she had begun writing songs. At age fifteen, she began using reel-to-reel recording to record her music, using a home computer to program the music.

Career

1995–1996: Almo Sounds & Acacia
After boarding school, she went on to study at the BRIT School for Performing Arts & Technology in Croydon, South London, where she first began regularly singing and writing songs due to loneliness. It was there that she recorded her first song to feature her vocals, "Missing You", which was released on the BRIT School's Class of 1994 album and earned her attention from manager Mickey Modern after he saw her performance at a talent showcase. After being introduced to Nik Kershaw by Modern, Heap recorded demos which were taken to Rondor Music. A few months later, Heap signed her first record contract, aged 18, with independent record label Almo Sounds.

In 1996, Heap began working with British experimental pop band Acacia, which featured her future collaborator Guy Sigsworth. While never a full member of the band, Heap was a guest vocalist and contributed to various Acacia singles and album tracks. Heap's first major live solo performance was as part of the line-up for the 1996 Prince's Trust Concert in Hyde Park.

1998–2001: I Megaphone
Heap's debut commercial single, "Getting Scared", was released in 1997. The song became the lead single from her debut album, I Megaphone, and was included in the soundtrack for the 1998 horror film I Still Know What You Did Last Summer. She released her debut album, the alternative rock record I Megaphone, on 16 June 1998 through Almo. The record was made with several producers, including English musician Dave Stewart and Sigsworth, and received some critical praise but was a commercial failure, as Almo did little to promote the album. Soon after Heap released the record, Almo Sounds was acquired by Universal, forcing its artists to either move to other labels or be released. Heap was one of the artists who was dropped from the label, leaving her without a record contract. I Megaphone had, however, been licensed from Almo Sounds to Aozora Records in Japan, who eventually re-released and re-promoted the album in January 2002, and included the bonus tracks "Blanket" and "Aeroplane".

During her time as an unsigned artist, Heap appeared on two singles: "Meantime", a track written by her former Acacia colleagues Guy Sigsworth and Alexander Nilere for the soundtrack to the independent British film G:MT – Greenwich Mean Time, and "Blanket", a 1998 collaboration with British hip hop band Urban Species. "Blanket" was Heap's first charting single, reaching number 56 on the UK Singles Chart. The song would later appear in a 2005 sex tape of Limp Bizkit frontman Fred Durst. Heap appeared as a featured vocalist on two songs"Dirty Mind" and "Rollin' and Tumblin'"on the 2001 album You Had It Coming by English guitarist Jeff Beck.

2002–2003: Frou Frou
Heap had kept in contact with Guy Sigsworth (who had co-written and produced "Getting Scared" from I Megaphone), and this led to the pair of them establishing the collaborative project Frou Frou.

The initial concept for Frou Frou was Sigsworth's, and the project was to have been an album written and produced by her with each track featuring a different singer, songwriter, poet or rapper. Heap explains that Sigsworth invited her over to his studio to write lyrics to a four-bar motif he had, with one condition – that she include the word "love" somewhere. The first line she came up with was "lung of love, leaves me breathless", and the Details album track "Flicks" was written. A week later, Sigsworth called Heap again, and together they wrote and recorded the future single "Breathe In".

On 4 June 2002, they released Details, their first and only album to date. The album spawned the singles "Breathe In", "It's Good to Be in Love" and "Must Be Dreaming". The song "Let Go" was featured on the soundtrack for the 2004 film Garden State.

In late 2003, after an extensive promotional tour of the UK, Europe and the US, the duo was told that their record label Island Records would not be picking up the option for a second album.

Heap and Sigsworth remain firm friends and have worked together since the project, including their temporary re-formation in late 2003, when they covered the Bonnie Tyler classic "Holding Out for a Hero" which was featured during the credits of the movie Shrek 2 after Jennifer Saunders' version in the film. Frou Frou saw a resurgence in popularity in 2004, when their album track "Let Go" was featured in the film Garden State, the soundtrack of which won a Grammy award.

In a 2005 interview, Heap said of Frou Frou, "[It] was really like a kind of little holiday from my own work. Guy and I, we have always worked together, and then over the years, it became clear that we wanted to do a whole album together. It was very organic and spontaneous – just one of those wonderful things that happens. But there was never a mention of a second record from either of us, and not uncomfortably. We're just both kind of free spirits. I love to work with a lot of different people, but I was also just gagging to see what I could do on my own. But I'm sure in the future, Guy and I will get back together to do another record, or to record a few songs together."

2004–2007: Speak for Yourself

In December 2003, Heap announced on her website that she was going to write and produce her second solo album, using her site as a blog to publicise progress.

Heap recorded a rendition of the song "I'm a Lonely Little Petunia (In an Onion Patch)" for the seventh episode of the fourth season of the HBO drama series Six Feet Under, which premiered in August 2004. Her rendition later appeared as the album closer for the 2005 soundtrack album Six Feet Under, Vol. 2: Everything Ends.

Heap set herself a deadline of one year to make the album, booking a session to master the album one year ahead in December 2004. She re-mortgaged her flat to fund production costs, including renting a studio at Atomic Studios, London (previously inhabited by UK grime artist, Dizzee Rascal), and purchasing instruments.

At the end of 2004, with the album completed, Heap premiered two album tracks online, selling them prior to the album's release – "Just for Now" and "Goodnight and Go".

In May 2005, Heap released the lead single from her forthcoming album, "Hide and Seek". The song earned immense popularity after being used to score the season two finale of the Fox television series The O.C. on the same day as its release. It peaked in the top-40 of the Billboard Digital Songs chart, eventually receiving a gold certification from the RIAA and going on to be sampled in the song "Whatcha Say" by American singer Jason Derulo, which topped the Billboard Hot 100.

Heap released the album on her own label, Megaphonic Records. The album was titled Speak for Yourself. Speak for Yourself was released in the UK on 18 July 2005 on CD and iTunes UK, where it entered the top 10 chart. The initial 10,000 physical copies pressed sold out, distributed through large and independent record stores and Heap's own online shop. In August 2005, Heap announced that she had licensed Speak for Yourself to RCA Records for the album's release in the United States, Canada and Mexico. The album was released in November 2005 and débuted at number 144 in the Billboard Top 200 album chart. In concert, Heap performed solo, controlling the sound through her laptop, as well as singing and playing the piano and array mbira. Also that month, Heap appeared on the soundtrack for the 2005 romantic comedy film Just Like Heaven, performing a cover of the song "Spooky" by American band Classics IV. Heap announced, upon her return to the UK, that she had signed a deal for the album to be released internationally, as well as re-promoted in the UK, with a new imprint of Sony BMG, White Rabbit, run by former Sony BMG UK A&R vice president Nick Raphael.

In November 2005, Heap wrote and recorded the song "Can't Take It In" for the soundtrack of the fantasy film The Chronicles of Narnia: The Lion, the Witch and the Wardrobe, which was released one month later.

Speak for Yourself was re-released on the label on 24 April 2006, ahead of a full promotional push on 15 May, a week after the second single, "Goodnight and Go", was commercially released in the UK. Heap recorded an a cappella cover of the Leonard Cohen song "Hallelujah" for the season three finale of The O.C., which premiered in May 2006.

In August 2006, Heap performed a set at the V Festival, where it was announced that "Headlock" was to be the third single lifted from the album and released on 16 October 2006 in the UK. Heap wrote and performed the song "Glittering Cloud", which was based on the plague of locusts, as part of an event called the Margate Exodus sponsored by Artangel in November 2006, where ten artists each performed one song based on one of the Plagues of Egypt in Margate. The songs were compiled in the 2006 album Plague Songs.

In late September and early October, Heap embarked on a tour of the UK, holding a competition on MySpace for different support acts for each venue before touring throughout Canada and the US in November and December. This was her first tour of North America that included a band, incorporating upright bass, percussion, and support acts Kid Beyond and Levi Weaver on beatbox and guitar, respectively. In December 2006, Heap was featured on the front page of The Green Room magazine.

On 7 December 2006, Heap received two Grammy nominations for the 49th Annual Grammy Awards, one for Best New Artist and the other for Best Song Written For Motion Picture, Television Or Other Visual Media for "Can't Take It In".

2008–2010: Ellipse

Throughout the creation of her album Ellipse, Heap posted vlogs or VBlogs as she called them, on YouTube.
She used these to comment on the album as well as update on its release.
The album's release was pushed back multiple times.
These included Heap being asked to perform at the annual event PopTech in October 2008. During the event, she premiered one of her album's songs, "Wait it Out".

In October 2008, Heap gave a musical performance in the anti-human trafficking documentary and rockumentary film Call + Response, directed by Justin Dillon. She was also featured on two songs on Jeff Beck's live album Live at Ronnie Scott's and appeared in the accompanying DVD in April 2009.

Heap announced on her Twitter page that Ellipses first single would be "First Train Home".

On 17 August 2009, Heap made the entire album Ellipse available for live streaming via her webpage.

Ellipse was released in the United Kingdom on 24 August 2009 and in the United States on 25 August 2009.

Heap received two nominations for the 49th Annual Grammy Awards, where she won the Grammy Award for Best Engineered Album, Non-Classical for her engineering work on Ellipse, making her the first female artist to win the award.

2011–2014: Sparks
In March 2011, Heap began working on her then-unnamed fourth studio album, Sparks, and revealed that she would be writing and releasing a new single for the album once every three months, beginning with the recording and release of the album's lead single, then released under the working title "Heapsong1" and eventually released commercially as "Lifeline", via Ustream. "Propeller Seeds", the second single, followed in July 2011.

The third single from the album, "Neglected Space", was created as part of Heap's project with charity organization Clear Village to restore a walled garden in Bedfords Park in October 2011. She starred in the debut episode of the MTV India musical reality television series The Dewarists, where she recorded "Minds Without Fear", her fourth single from Sparks, with Indian production duo Vishal–Shekhar. Both "Neglected Space" and "Minds Without Fear" were released in October 2011.

Heap released "Xizi She Knows", the fifth single from the album, in February 2012.

On 6 May 2011, Heap tweeted that she and deadmau5 were working on a collaboration. The song was titled "Telemiscommunications" and included in deadmau5's sixth studio album, Album Title Goes Here.

On 9 September 2012, Heap wrote and released "Someone's Calling" as a ringtone. Also in 2012, she showcased the Mi.Mu gloves on an episode of the BBC television series Dara Ó Briain's Science Club.

Heap's fourth album, Sparks, was released on 18 August 2014.

2015–present: Harry Potter and the Cursed Child

In October 2015, Heap released the single "Tiny Human" using her blockchain-based platform Mycelia. Sales of "Tiny Human" via Ethereum smart contracts as of October 2017 were £30,000. After being contacted by movement director Steven Hoggett, Heap reworked and composed music from her catalogue to be used as the music in Harry Potter and the Cursed Child, the eighth instalment of the Harry Potter series in the form of a West End play that opened in the summer of 2016. For her work on the play, she received several award nominations, including for the Grammy Award for Best Musical Theater Album, the Laurence Olivier Award for Outstanding Achievement in Music and the Outer Critics Circle Award for Outstanding New Score (Broadway or Off-Broadway), and won the Drama Desk Award for Outstanding Music in a Play.

Heap co-wrote and produced the Taylor Swift song "Clean", which appeared as the closer to Swift's fifth studio album 1989 and led to her being part of the production team that won Album of the Year at the 58th Grammy Awards. She was one of the artists featured in an episode of the 2016 PBS docuseries Soundbreaking and she narrated and composed music for the 2016 documentary Crossing Bhutan, which premiered at the Santa Barbara International Film Festival. Also in 2016, she was commissioned by French advertising agency BETC and British company Cow & Gate, in collaboration with researchers from Goldsmiths, University of London, to help write a song which would be proven to "make babies happy", which was eventually titled "The Happy Song". The track was engineered through several months of scientific testing and was released in October 2016.

Heap wrote, produced and recorded the song "Magic Me" as the score for the 2017 animated short film Escape, which premiered at the 2017 Tribeca Film Festival in April of that year. Heap also recorded "The Quiet" as the end credits song for the 2017 Square Enix video game The Quiet Man. She performed "Hide and Seek" at the benefit concert and television special One Love Manchester in Manchester in June 2017. Her performance was praised by critics as "powerful" and "melancholy". The following month, she was featured on the song "We Drift On" by British singer-songwriter Dan Black from his second studio album Do Not Revenge. She announced in November 2017 that she would be reuniting Frou Frou with Guy Sigsworth and would be embarking on the Mycelia World Tour with him to promote the release of Mycelia's Creative Passport program. In March 2018, she was awarded the Inspiration Award at the 2018 Music Producers Guild Awards.

On 18 September 2018, Heap released The Music of Harry Potter and the Cursed Child in Four Contemporary Suites, a condensed soundtrack album of the play. An interview with her appeared in the Alex Winter-directed documentary Trust Machine: The Story of Blockchain in November 2018. The Mycelia World Tour began in Europe in 2018, while the North American leg began in April 2019, marking her first North American tour in nine years and her first tour as part of Frou Frou since 2003. That same month, she and Sigsworth released "Guitar Song (Live)", their first Frou Frou song in 15 years, through We Are Hear. She gave a lecture at Boston Calling Music Festival in May 2019. In June 2019, she announced that she planned to release an album consisting of collaborations in 2020, the lead single of which would be one of three versions of "The Quiet". She also performed on NPR's Tiny Desk Concerts series that same month.

She hosted the 62nd Annual Grammy Awards Premiere Ceremony in January 2020. In April 2020, she appeared as a main artist on the commercial re-release of the 2009 song "I'm God" by Italian-American record producer Clams Casino, which samples Heap's song "Just for Now", and released the single "Phase and Flow" as part of a collaboration with IBM. The following month, she performed during Royal Albert Hall's Royal Albert Home virtual concert series. Heap gave a livestreamed closing performance for the Virtual Design Festival held by Dezeen in July 2020. During the COVID-19 pandemic, she launched a self-titled app for fans to view unreleased material and demos and participate in listening parties with her through Discord for a monthly fee, and began work on a project called "Augmented Imogen", meant to be an AI version of herself. She released the single "Last Night of an Empire" in December 2020. In late March 2022, Imogen Heap partnered with Symphonic Distribution to re-release previous material, including a handful of Frou Frou demos, which will compile into the Off Cuts release. The first single "A New Kind of Love (Demo)" is slated to release 8 April.

Film
After touring for nearly two years straight for her album Speak for Yourself, Heap continued her travels, this time with only a laptop and video camera on hand as she began her writing trip for her next album. Nine weeks later she returned to the UK with the beginnings of the award-winning Ellipse and footage (as requested by a fan to film the making of the album) from its quiet beginning. Back in Essex, Heap hired Justine Pearsall to document the creation of the album. The film documents the creation of the album and the renovation of Heap's childhood home, including turning her old playroom into her new home studio. Everything In-Between: The Story of Ellipse was released in November 2010.

On 5 November 2010 at the Royal Albert Hall, Heap conducted an orchestra including her friends and family as they performed an original piece composed by Heap and orchestrated by Andrew Skeet. Heap also worked with London Contemporary Voices at this time, a scratch choir formed for this concert, which continues as a new choir in its own right. It was the score to the concept film Love The Earth, for which fans were invited to submit video footage highlighting all the qualities of nature to be selected and edited into a film. This performance was broadcast live worldwide.

In March, for the Birds Eye View Film Festival at the Southbank Centre, Heap, in collaboration with Andrew Skeet, composed an a cappella choral score for the first-ever surrealist film The Seashell and the Clergyman (Germaine Dulac, 1927), with the Holst Singers, a programme repeated at the Reverb Festival at the Roundhouse in February 2012 and in the Sage, Gateshead.

Heap performed in the Film and Music Arena at Latitude Festival in 2011.

In 2014, filmmaker Christopher Ian Smith made Cumulus, an experimental documentary exploring key elements of Heap's background, personality and music practice. Crafted entirely out of social media content and data created by Heap and her fans, Cumulus explores Imogen's digital footprint and identity as well as her relationship with fans. The film is available to view online.

Other endeavors

Mi.Mu

In July 2011, Heap unveiled a pair of in-development, wired musical gloves at the TEDGlobal conference in Edinburgh, Scotland. They were originally developed by Heap with Tom Mitchell, a University of the West of England, Bristol lecturer in music systems, and designed and sewn by Rachel Freire, a costume designer, over the course of the prior two and a half years. They were inspired by another pair of musical gloves developed by engineer Elly Jessop at MIT which Heap had witnessed during a visit to the university's Media Lab. Early versions of Heap's gloves had issues with latency and accuracy. In an interview, Heap stated, "The gloves help me embody those sounds which are hidden inside the computer, for me to physicalize them and bring them out so that I can play them and the audience members will understand what I am doingrather than fiddling around on a keyboard and mouse which is not very clearI could just be doing my emails."

The gloves, which eventually came to be known as the Mi.Mu gloves (a name derived from an abbreviation of "me" and "music"), are made from the material Yulex and consist of a hardware board at the wrist developed by Seb Madgwick with an inertial measurement unit used to determine the speed and orientation of the hands, flex sensors over the knuckles, a haptic motor, a removable battery, open palms and LED lights in between the thumb and forefinger which indicate whether or not the user is recording. Open Sound Control data is sent to a computer, which can perform a number of different actions, including adjusting volume, recording loops and filtering sound. The gloves also come with a custom software called Glover that can be integrated with music production apps such as Ableton Live and Pro Tools, and use 802.11 Wi-Fi.

Heap recorded the sixth single from Sparks, "Me the Machine", using an early version of the gloves, debuting the single during a livestream on Earth Day in 2012. Heap began crowdfunding to produce more pairs of the gloves in April 2014 on Kickstarter, with a goal of £200,000, but the campaign failed to meet its target. However, the Mi.Mu project found investors who collaborated with Heap's team to continue to develop the gloves. An early investor and user of the gloves was American singer Ariana Grande, who used the gloves during her second concert tour, The Honeymoon Tour, in 2015. In April 2019, the Mi.Mu gloves became publicly available for pre-order. Popular Science included the Mi.Mu gloves on their list of the 100 greatest innovations of 2019.

Mycelia
In October 2015, Heap released the single "Tiny Human" using the blockchain-based platform Mycelia, which she created as a decentralized musical database for artists to share their music on and enforce smart contracts using Ethereum. Mycelia's Creative Passport program is a personalized profile for artists not signed to a major label.

Artistry

In the late 1990s, Heap's music was largely alternative rock. Her earlier songs, specifically those from her debut album I Megaphone, were frequently compared in the media to those of fellow singer-songwriters Tori Amos, Kate Bush and Alanis Morissette. However, after forming and subsequently disbanding the electronic duo Frou Frou, whose work on their sole album to date, Details, was mainly alternative pop and electropop, her music became primarily based in pop, specifically electropop, art pop and synth-pop. She has written, produced and engineered most of her music on her own. She has also stated that she rarely listens to music, but draws inspiration from TED conferences.

Heap plays a number of instruments, including piano, clarinet, cello, guitar, drums and the array mbira. She extensively uses manipulated electronic sounds as an integral part of her music. She also mixes ambient sound into her music and has commented that "certain sounds give the music a width and a space, and that's important." CNN stated that Heap is known for "her distinctive fusion of soft acoustic sounds, electronica and tech".

Heap states that her song lyrics come from personal experience, but are not straightforwardly confessional. She has stated, "Most of the time, the lyrics are kind of like my secret messages to my friends or my boyfriend or my mum or my dad. I would never tell them that these songs are about them or which specific lyric is about somebody. Often, when I sit down to write a lyric, it is in the heat of the moment, and something has just happened."

Heap's frog-themed outfit at the 49th Annual Grammy Awards has been included in several lists of the most "outrageous" Grammys outfits of all time.

Legacy
Heap has been regarded as influential in pop music, specifically in electropop and for using technology in her music. NPR's Lindsay Kimbell also referred to Heap as a "pioneer of electronic pop" in 2018. Billboard called Heap an "electro-pop innovator". In 2018, Stereogums Margaret Farrell referred to Heap as "pop's unsung pioneer" and "an electronic pop mastermind", going on to describe her as "a mystical force that has loomed over pop music for nearly two decades". In 2019, The New York Times similarly called Heap a "pop pioneer" whose work "has established her as an innovator in musical technology". For Paper, Matt Moen called Heap "the Nikola Tesla of pop music" in that "[her] influence in the field of pop has largely gone unappreciated in her own time". Various outlets, including NPR and New Statesman, have called Heap a "tech pioneer". Patrick Ryan of USA Today wrote that Heap "pioneered" the subgenre of folktronica, which combines elements of folk music and electronica.

Heap has been cited as a musical inspiration by a number of artists and groups, including Ariana Grande, Bebe Rexha, Ellie Goulding, Kacey Musgraves, Pentatonix, Chloe Bailey, Empress Of, Dawn Richard, Jamila Woods, Muna, Mree, Woodes, Ben Hopkins, Matthew Parker, Red Moon, Michelle Chamuel, Chaz Cardigan, Laura Doggett, GoodLuck, Kool Kojak, and Stars and Rabbit. Heap's songs have also been covered by artists including Pentatonix and Kelly Clarkson, and have been sampled by artists including Grande, Jason Derulo, Wiz Khalifa, Mac Miller, Clams Casino, Lil B, Ryan Hemsworth, Deniro Farrar, Suicideboys, ASAP Rocky, MellowHype, Trinidad James, Kendrick Lamar, and Vierre Cloud. The sampling of her songs has been considered influential in the subgenre of cloud rap.

Charity

In 2008, Heap participated in an album called Songs for Tibet: The Art of Peace, which is an initiative to support Tibet, Dalai Lama Tenzin Gyatso and to underline the human rights situation in Tibet. The album was released on 5 August via iTunes and on 19 August in music stores around the world. On 12 October 2008, Heap participated in "Run 10k: Cancer Research UK", placing fifth of the women in the actual run and raising over £1000 for the cause with the help of her fans.

In 2010 Heap began performing improvised pieces at shows, asking for donations for charity after the show to download the song.

In 2011, Heap played a benefit concert in Christchurch, New Zealand, to help rebuild the Unlimited Paenga Tawhiti High School following a severe earthquake which destroyed a large portion of the city earlier in the year. The concert was held at the Burnside High Aurora Centre, also featuring performances from Roseanna Gamlen-Greene, and The Harbour Union including The Eastern, Lindon Puffin, Delaney Davidson and The Unfaithful Ways. It was her only New Zealand show for the year.

On 4 June 2017, Heap performed at One Love Manchester, a benefit concert organised by Ariana Grande in response to the bombing after her concert at Manchester Arena two weeks earlier. She performed "Hide and Seek". Other celebrity participants included Katy Perry, Justin Bieber, Niall Horan, Coldplay, Miley Cyrus and Pharrell Williams.

Live 4 X
In 2010, Imogen Heap partnered with Thomas Ermacora of Bubbletank to organise a series of online charitable events called Live 4 X.

The initial event was inspired by the 2010 Pakistan floods. Triggered by monsoon rains, the floods left approximately one-fifth of the country of Pakistan under water, affecting over 14 million people and damaging or destroying over 900,000 homes. Teaming up with Richard Branson's Virgin Unite and Vokle.com, Heap and Ermacora created a webcast/online fundraiser to raise awareness and money for those affected by the floods. Hosted by comedian, creative and Internet personality Ze Frank, the webcast included a series of conversations with Cameron Sinclair of Architecture for Humanity, Gary Slutkin and Anders Wilhelmson (and later Richard Branson and Mary Robinson), with live performances by musicians Ben Folds, Amanda Palmer, Kate Havnevik, KT Tunstall, Josh Groban, Kaki King, Zoe Keating and Mark Isham.

The premise of Live 4 X thus established, Heap has since continued to refine the model, organize, host and perform a number of charitable, live-streaming concert events. By integrating live entertainment with educated discussion and technology, Live 4 X became an effective charitable outreach tool.

Following the Great East Japan earthquake and tsunami of 2011, Heap told Washington Times Communities journalist and recording artist Jennifer Grassman that she intended to continue organising Live 4 X events to benefit various charitable causes.

Catalogue of Live 4 X events to date:
 31 August 2010 – Live 4 Pakistan raised funds for flood relief and recovery in that region. Musicians included Ben Folds, Amanda Palmer, Kate Havnevik, KT Tunstall, Josh Groban and Zoe Keating. In an ironic turn of events, Heap was kept from appearing on Live 4 Pakistan due to Hurricane Earl which at the time was progressing along the US eastern seaboard. Heap, stranded and unable to get an internet connection, later posted a video message as well as a performance of her song "Wait It Out" from Ellipse.
 3 February 2011 – Live 4 Cape Town
 11 April 2011 – Live 4 Sendai raised funds for Japanese tsunami recovery following the disastrous Great East Japan earthquake of 2011. The event was also used to solicit rebuilding design ideas on behalf of Architecture for Humanity. Performers included Amanda Palmer, Ben Folds, KT Tunstall and Jamie Cullum and hosted by Ze Frank.

Personal life
Heap began dating film director Michael Lebor in 2012. In June 2014, Heap announced in her video blog that she was pregnant with her first child with Lebor. She gave birth to their daughter later that year.

Heap's sister, Juliet, died while abroad in November 2019.

Discography

 I Megaphone (1998)
 Speak for Yourself (2005)
 Ellipse (2009)
 Sparks (2014)
 The Music of Harry Potter & The Cursed Child - In Four Contemporary Parts (2018)
 Chordata Bytes I & II (2022)

Tours
 Ellipse Tour (2009–2010)
 Mycelia Tour (2019–2020)

Awards and nominations

See also 
 List of ambient music artists

References

External links

 
 

1977 births
Living people
Ableton Live users
Almo Sounds artists
British women record producers
English audio engineers
English electronic musicians
English expatriates in Japan
English expatriates in the United States
English multi-instrumentalists
English record producers
English women in electronic music
English women singer-songwriters
Grammy Award winners
Ivor Novello Award winners
People educated at Friends School Saffron Walden
People educated at the BRIT School
People from the London Borough of Havering
RCA Records artists
Singers from London
Synth-pop singers
Women rock singers
20th-century English singers
21st-century English singers
20th-century English women singers
21st-century English women singers
British autoharp players